Frisco, also spelled Fresco, is an unincorporated community in Coffee County, Alabama, United States.

History
A post office operated under the name Fresco from 1887 to 1904.

References

Unincorporated communities in Coffee County, Alabama
Unincorporated communities in Alabama